Shake Off the Dust... Arise is the first album by Matisyahu, was released on October 28, 2004, by JDub Records. It fell out of print following his move to Epic Records and remained a collector's item until it was remastered and reissued in October 2010, sold exclusively through his official website. The album is now widely available as a digital download through standard retailers, albeit with modified cover art.

The album's name comes from the Hebrew liturgical poem "Lekhah Dodi" which is sung by most Jewish denominations in order to welcome the holy Sabbath, which in the poem is referred to as a bride.

Track listing
 "Chop 'em Down" – 5:45
 "Tzama L'Chol Nafshi (Psalm 63:2-3)" – 1:50
 "Got No Water" – 5:54
 "King Without a Crown" – 5:19
 "Interlude" – 0:54
 "Father in the Forest" – 4:59
 "Interlude" – 0:17
 "Aish Tamid" – 6:48
 "Short Nigun" – 1:46
 "Candle" – 6:22
 "Close My Eyes" – 4:55
 "Interlude" – 0:17
 "Exaltation" – 5:04
 "Refuge" – 3:28
 "Interlude" – 0:23
 "Warrior" – 7:23
 "Outro" – 2:15

Reissue
In 2010, the album was remastered and reissued with a new cover with a detailed pencil portrait of Matisyahu (real name: Matthew Miller), drawn by Diane Russell, overlaid on a Star of David.

Personnel
Matisyahu Miller – vocals
Aaron Dugan – guitar (tracks 3, 8 & 11)
Josh Werner – bass guitar, keyboards, steel-string guitar (tracks 10 & 14)
Jonah David – drums (tracks 1, 3, 8, 10 & 11), percussion (tracks 4)
Marlon "Moshe" Sobol – melodica (tracks 3 & 8)
Yerachmiel Altizio – guitar (tracks 1, 4, 6 & 16)
Alon Cohan – drums (tracks 9 & 16), percussion (tracks 2, 3 & 13)
Rea Mochiach – drums (tracks 4 & 5)
Tom Mochiach – guitar (tracks 3, 4 & 10)
Lior Rachmany – guitar (tracks 13)
Pieter Woudt – trumpet (tracks 1, 2, 3, 4, 9 & 16)
Rabbi Wircberg – spoken voice (tracks 5 & 15)
Rabbi Goldberg – spoken voice (tracks 17)

Produced and arranged by Alon Cohen
Recorded and mixed by Alon Cohen

References

External links
Shake off the Dust... Arise lyrics

Matisyahu albums
2004 debut albums
JDub Records albums